Rowland Thomas Jones (1871 – 2 February 1952) was an English professional golfer who played in the late 19th and early 20th century. Jones had two top-10 finishes in the Open Championship. His best performance came in the 1905 Open Championship when he finished tied for second place.

Early life
Jones was born in St Helens, Isle of Wight, England, in 1871, the son of James Jones and Maria Saunders.

Golfing career
Jones won the Tooting Bec Cup in 1908 having been a runner-up in 1901. He was runner-up in the London Professional Foursomes Tournament in 1907, where he partnered Alfred Toogood, and was a losing semi-finalist in the 1905 and 1906 News of the World Match Play. He won the Belgian Open in 1920 and, as late as 1924, he was runner-up in the Roehampton Invitation Tournament where he lost by 1 hole to Ted Ray.

Jones was professional at Wimbledon Park Golf Club for 37 years from the opening of the club in 1898 until his retirement in 1935. He had earlier been at Littlehampton Golf Club since at least 1893.

1905 Open Championship
The 1905 Open Championship was held 7–9 June at the Old Course at St Andrews, Fife, Scotland. Scottish champion golfer James Braid won the Championship for the second time, by five strokes from runners-up Jones and the legendary J.H. Taylor.

All entries played 18 holes on the first two days with all those within 14 strokes of the leader making the cut and playing 36 holes on the final day. Strong winds and baked hardpan conditions made scoring exceptionally difficult on all three days.  Only a few players managed to break 80. Sandy Herd, Taylor and Harry Vardon led after the first round with scores of 80. Scoring was marginally better on the second day with Jones's 77 giving him the lead on 158. He was followed by Braid on 159 and James Kinnell and Arnaud Massy on 161. Just 45 players made the cut of 172 and only one amateur, John Graham, Jr., was among those select few.

Braid had round-by-round scoring of 81-78-78-81=318 and won £50. Jones's rounds of 81-77-87-78=323 enabled him to go home with £20. The third round 87 was detrimental to his opportunity to win.

Death
Jones died at St Helens, Isle of Wight, on 2 February 1952.

Tournament wins (1)
Note: This list may be incomplete.
1920 Belgian Open

Results in major championships

Note: Jones only played in The Open Championship.

NT = No tournament
WD = Withdrew
CUT = missed the half-way cut
"T" indicates a tie for a place

† In 1903 Jones was disqualified after the first day for incorrectly placing his ball on one of the holes. He was then reinstated and completed the final two rounds.

Team appearances
England–Scotland Professional Match (representing England): 1903, 1904 (tie), 1905 (tie), 1906 (winners) 1907 (winners), 1909 (winners), 1910 (winners), 1912 (tie), 1913 (winners)
Coronation Match (representing the Professionals): 1911 (winners)

References

English male golfers
Sportspeople from the Isle of Wight
History of the Isle of Wight
1871 births
1952 deaths